Shmuel Barzilai (born 3 June 1957) is an Israeli cantor. He is the chief cantor of the Israelitische Kultusgemeinde Wien in Vienna.

Biography
Shmuel Barzilai was born in Jerusalem. He is a son of Shlomo Barzilai, also a cantor. Barzilai has a lyrical tenor voice, and studied under cantor Moshe Stern at the Tel Aviv Institute for Cantorial Art. He was in the first graduating class of the Institute, which was established under former Tel Aviv mayor Shlomo Lahat.

Cantorial career
Barzilai has served as the chief cantor in Vienna since 1992 and frequently tours throughout Europe.

Discography 
 "Das Lied der Lieder; Festgesänge des Wiener Stadttempels", Jüdisches Museum Wien, ÖRF (1993)
 "Schir Zion" (composed by Salomon Sulzer), Jüdisches Museum Wien, ORF (1996)
 "Best Chasidic" (1996)
 "Live in Concert: אב הרחמים"
 "Shalom" (1999; with Hanan Bar Sela, Arie Braun; jacket design by Dvora Barzilai</ref> http://david.juden.at/kulturzeitschrift/66-70/66-Gerstl.htm</ref>
 "Wiener Sängerknaben & Oberkantor Shmuel Barzilai", ORF (2000)
 "The Symphony of Prayer; ", ORF (2003; conducting by Elli Jaffe)

References

External links 
 Official Website

1957 births
Living people
Viennese hazzans
Israeli hazzans
Israeli tenors
Austrian tenors
Israeli composers
Austrian male composers
Austrian composers
Israeli emigrants to Austria
Austrian people of Israeli descent
People from Jerusalem
People from Innere Stadt